Sicovam, an acronym for Société Interprofessionnelle pour la Compensation des Valeurs Mobilières, is both a security identifier system used to identify French securities listed on French stock exchanges, as well as the company set up to assign them. Sicovam was merged into the European-wide Euroclear and as of July 1, 2003 SICOVAMs are no longer issued, ISINs being used instead.

Description
Sicovams consist of a six-digit identifier, assigned by the Sicovam group "by hand" in order of issue. For instance, Alcatel was assigned 013000.

Sicovams could be directly converted to ISINs as with other older systems, including CUSIP and SEDOL. To do so the number was padded out with three zeros on the front, then the country code "FR" was added to the front and the ISIN check digit to the end.

Security identifier types
Financial metadata